Bashir or Bushra al-Thamali was an Abbasid military commander and governor (wali or amir) of Tarsus and the borderlands with the Byzantine Empire in Cilicia.

Life
Bushra was a retainer (ghulam) of the long-time governor of Tarsus, and the borderlands with the Byzantine Empire in Cilicia, Thamal al-Dulafi.

In 925 he served as Thamal's deputy during the latter's absence in a campaign against the Qarmatians in Iraq. Along with the court eunuch Muflih he supervised the prisoner exchange with the Byzantines at the Lamos River in September–October 925.

By 938, he occupied the post the governor himself, and again supervised a prisoner exchange with the Byzantines, along with Ibn Warqa al-Shaybani. After 6,300 Muslims were exchanged for an equivalent number of Byzantines, the Byzantines still held 800 Muslim prisoners left, who were ransomed over the next six months at the Podandos river.

References

Sources
 
 

9th-century births
10th-century deaths
Abbasid governors of Tarsus
Abbasid people of the Arab–Byzantine wars
Abbasid ghilman
10th-century people from the Abbasid Caliphate